Sindre Mauritz-Hansen (born 18 October 1994) is a Norwegian professional footballer who currently plays for Asker.

Career

Club
On 7 December 2016, Mauritz-Hansen signed a professional contract with Stabæk., where he previously played as a youth player, after scoring 68 goals in 74 appearances in all competitions for Asker.

He made his first appearance in Eliteserien on 17 April 2017 as an overtime substitute in a 3-0 victory against Sarpsborg 08. On 26 April 2017, Mauritz-Hansen scored a hat-trick in a 9-0 victory against Holmlia in the first round of the Norwegian Football Cup, which was his first official goals for Stabæk.

Career statistics

Club

References

External links
 
 stabak.no
 

1994 births
Living people
People from Asker
Norwegian footballers
Norway youth international footballers
Association football forwards
Asker Fotball players
Stabæk Fotball players
Strømmen IF players
Lillestrøm SK players
Eliteserien players
Norwegian First Division players
Norwegian Second Division players
Norwegian Third Division players
Sportspeople from Viken (county)